The buildings and structures of Belfast, Northern Ireland comprise many styles of architecture ranging from Edwardian through to state-of-the-art modern buildings like the Waterfront Hall. The city's beautiful Edwardian buildings are notable for their display of a large number of sculptures. Many of Belfast's Victorian landmarks, including the main Lanyon Building at Queens University in 1849, were designed by Sir Charles Lanyon.

The City Hall, was finished in 1906 and was built to reflect Belfast's City status, granted by Queen Victoria in 1888. The Dome is 53 metres (173 ft) high. Figures above the door are "Hibernia encouraging and promoting the Commerce and Arts of the City". Among the city's grandest buildings are two former banks: Ulster Bank (1860), in Waring Street and Northern Bank (1769), in nearby Donegall Street. The Royal Courts of Justice in Chichester Street are home to Northern Ireland's Supreme Court. Some of Belfast's oldest buildings still remain in the Cathedral Quarter area, which is currently undergoing redevelopment as the city's main cultural and tourist area.

The world's largest dry dock is located in the city, and the giant cranes (Samson and Goliath) of the Harland and Wolff shipyard, builders of the Titanic, can be seen from afar. Other long-gone industries included Irish linen and rope-making.

The four star Europa Hotel, located in the City Centre, was bombed twenty-seven times during the troubles and is one of the most bombed hotels in Europe Across the street, the ornately decorated Crown Liquor Saloon in Great Victoria Street is notable as being the only bar owned by the National Trust. The panels used in the restaurant on the first floor were meant for Brittanic, the sister ship of the Titanic. It was made internationally famous as the setting for the classic film, Odd Man Out, starring James Mason.

Belfast also contains the tallest building (as distinct from structure) on the island of Ireland.

The Albert Clock stands at the end of High Street, and was designed by William J. Barre and built in memory of Queen Victoria's Prince Consort, Prince Albert. The clock stands 35 m high, was built on land reclaimed from the river, and leans 1.25 m off the vertical. The Linen Hall Library in Donegall Square North is Belfast's oldest library, founded in 1788 to acquire 'philosophical apparatus and such productions of nature and art as are calculated to enlarge knowledge'

St George's Market, built between 1890 and 1896, is Belfast's last surviving Victorian covered market. It was restored at a cost of £4.5 million in 1997, and hosts regular Friday and Saturday markets. Near the Market is Saint Malachy's Catholic Church. Built between 1841 and 1844, it is built in the Tudor Revival style and is unique in Ireland. It is also one of only two buildings remaining in Belfast which was constructed with hand-made bricks. Hamilton Street is a Georgian terrace in the Markets Area, originally built in the 1830s, which was restored in 1988 by Hearth.

Belfast has several venues for performing arts. The Grand Opera House was completed in 1895 was bombed several times during the Troubles but has been restored to its former glory. The Ulster Hall (1859–1862) was originally designed for grand dances but is now used primarily as a concert and sporting venue.  Lloyd George, Parnell and Patrick Pearse all attended political rallies there. It holds 13 paintings of Belfast History. The Mulholland organ costing 3000 guineas was donated and named after a local wealthy industrialist. The Waterfront Hall was opened in 1997 as part of the redevelopment of the Laganside and already has become an icon of modern Belfast. Under construction in 2007 is the new Victoria Square development with a huge glass dome. The Victoria Square in now completed.

See also
 Belfast
 Architecture of Belfast
 List of tallest buildings and structures in Belfast
 Districts of Belfast
 List of parks and gardens in Belfast
 Sir Charles Lanyon

External links
 Archiseek: Belfast Architecture

References